Grotbreahesten is a mountain in Lom Municipality in Innlandet county, Norway. The mountain is surrounded by several other notable mountains including Finnshalspiggen and Nørdre Trollsteinhøe to the north, Smådalshøe to the northeast, Trollsteineggi and Glittertinden to the south, Trollsteinrundhøe to the west, and Gråhøe and Svartholshøe to the northwest.

See also
List of mountains of Norway

References

Lom, Norway
Jotunheimen
Mountains of Innlandet